The Sanctuary of Santa Maria della Pioggia is a small church, located on Via Riva Reno 122, between Galliera road and Riva di Reno road in central Bologna, Italy. It was once the Oratory of San Bartolomeo di Reno.

History 
By the year 1204, the Oratory of St Bartolomeo di Reno at this site sheltered a venerated icon of the Madonna and Child. After the plague of 1527, the adjacent buildings were transformed from a hostel for pilgrims into an orphanage. Over the centuries, the church, located below the oratory, was enlarged and refurbished, gaining the name of the Madonna della Pioggia after a procession to the church was followed by a rainfall ending a drought. Major reconstruction occurred in 1729 under Alfonso Torreggiani.

The icon of the Madonna and Child with seven angel heads at the main altar is attributed to the 15th-century painter Michele di Matteo. The church has three paintings by Agostino Carracci: Adoration by the Shepherds, St Bartolomeo di Reno and the two Prophets in the arch of the chapel. Other artworks include: a Santo Bartolomeo by Francesco Monti; a St Vincent Ferrer by Antonio Crespi, and St Luigi Gonzaga by Ercole Graziani. Other paintings attributed to Graziani include the following works in the sacristy: St Peter after the triple denial of Christ, Mystical Marriage of St Catherine; Burial of St Catherine of Alexandria. Also in the sacristy is a Camillo dè Lellis tending to the sick by Dante Bizzotto ((1911–1967); a statue representing St Anthony of Padua and Child Jesus by Giovanni Antonio Raimondi; and an Enthroned Madonna and Child with St Catherine and Lucy by Alessandro Stiatici.

The stairwell to the oratory is frescoed with a Landscape with St Bartholomew by Ludovico Mattioli.

The sanctuary has been recently restored and now owned by the Pii Istituti Educativi (Charitable Educational Institutions).

References 

Roman Catholic churches in Bologna
Baroque architecture in Bologna
1204 establishments in Europe
13th-century establishments in Italy
17th-century Roman Catholic church buildings in Italy
Churches completed in 1729